The Confederación de los Trabajadores de América Latina (CTAL) was a continental trade union federation for Latin America in the mid-20th century.

History
The CTAL was conceived at the first International Labour Organization conference on the Americas in January 1936 when the Latin American resolved to form a strong continental labor organization. This was followed up by a call from the Confederación de Trabajadores de México for a congress in 1938.

This congress created the Confederación de los Trabajadores de América Latina and elected Vicente Lombardo Toledano president. The new organization declared that "the social regime that now prevails in most countries on Earth has to be substituted by a regime of justice based on the abolition of man by man". It also condemned Nazism and Fascism in the strongest possible terms.

CTAL was very active during World War II, creating unions where they were non-existent, uniting previously existing unions and assuring that ILO standards like freedom of association, collective bargaining, the right to strike and indigenous rights were respected. After the war, it called for the industrialization of Latin America to further its development.

After the war most of CTALs affiliates attended the founding conference of the World Federation of Trade Unions in Paris and the CTAL soon became the WFTU's regional organization. However, after the split in the WFTU in 1949 the CTAL was severely weakened. May affiliates drifted away and the Confederation lost strength. Its remaining members agreed to dissolve CTAL in 1964.

See also
Confederación Sindical Latinoamericana, an earlier Communist affiliated Latin American labor federation
Confederación Interamericana de Trabajadores, an A.F.L. affiliated federation designed to compete with CTAL
Permanent Congress of Trade Union Unity of Latin America
Serafino Romualdi

References

Bibliography

Trade unions established in 1936
Trade unions disestablished in 1964
Defunct transnational trade unions
Inter-American trade union federations
World Federation of Trade Unions

es:Confederación de Trabajadores de América Latina
fr:Congrès permanent d'unité syndicale des travailleurs d'Amérique latine et des Caraïbes